Castelluccio may refer to:

People
Federico Castelluccio (born 1964), Italian-born American actor
Franco Castelluccio (born 1955), American sculptor
Frankie Valli, born Francesco Castelluccio (1934), American singer

Italian locations
Castelluccio dei Sauri, a town and comune in the province of Foggia, Apulia region
Castelluccio Inferiore, a town and comune in the province of Potenza, Basilicata region
Castelluccio Superiore, a town and comune in the province of Potenza, Basilicata region
Castelluccio Valmaggiore, a town and comune in the province of Foggia, Apulia region
Castelluccio (Norcia), a frazione of Norcia, province of Perugia, Umbria region
Castelluccio, a frazione of Castel San Giorgio, province of Salerno, Campania region
Castelluccio, a frazione of Alto Reno Terme,  Metropolitan City of Bologna, Emilia-Romagna region
Castelluccio Cosentino, a frazione  of Sicignano degli Alburni, province of Salerno, Campania region
Castelluccio di Gela, a Hohenstaufen medieval fortification in Gela, Sicily
 Castelluccio di Noto, an archaeological site in Sicily
Castelluccio culture, an Ancient Bronze Age culture